John Wu or Wu Chih-yang (born 8 February 1969) is a Taiwanese politician. He was the Magistrate of Taoyuan County from 2009 to 2014. Wu was the former Chinese Professional Baseball League (CPBL) commissioner.

Early life
Wu obtained his bachelor's and master's degree in law from National Taiwan University. He then obtained another law degree from Harvard University in the United States.

Taoyuan County Magistrate

2009 Taoyuan County Magistrate election
Wu was elected Magistrate of Taoyuan County on 5 December 2009 defeating Cheng Wen-tsan in the 2009 magisterial election as a Kuomintang candidate. He assumed the office on 20 December 2009.

Taoyuan County upgrade
In July 2014, it was announced that Taoyuan County would be renamed Taoyuan and reclassified as a special municipality by the end of the year. The county-administered city, known officially as Taoyuan City, was to be renamed Taoyuan District.

2014 Taoyuan City mayoral election
Shortly before the reclassification of Taoyuan County as a special municipality, Wu ran for the Taoyuan mayoralty in the 2014 Taiwanese local elections, again facing Cheng Wen-tsan, and lost.

CPBL Commissioner
Wu became the commissioner of Taiwan's Chinese Professional Baseball League in 2015, and was reelected in 2017 with unanimous support. During Wu's term, he further expanded CPBL from four teams to five teams, with the addition of Wei Chuan Dragons. As Wu's term ended, Tsai Chi-chang became Wu's successor as CPBL commissioner in January 2021.

References

Party List Members of the Legislative Yuan
Living people
1969 births
Taiwanese politicians of Hakka descent
Magistrates of Taoyuan County
Kuomintang Members of the Legislative Yuan in Taiwan
Harvard Law School alumni
Members of the 9th Legislative Yuan
Members of the 6th Legislative Yuan
Members of the 7th Legislative Yuan
Taoyuan City Members of the Legislative Yuan
National Taipei University alumni
Chinese Professional Baseball League commissioners